Bernard Cornelis (Ben) Sombogaart (born 8 August 1947) is a Dutch film and TV director.

His film Twin Sisters (2002) was nominated for the Academy Award for Best Foreign Language Film.

Filmography
The Boy Who Stopped Talking (1996)
Twin Sisters (2002)
Tow Truck Pluck (2004)
Crusade in Jeans (2006)
Bride Flight (2008)
The Storm (2009) – film about North Sea flood of 1953
Moordvrouw (2012-)
In My Father's Garden (2016)
Rafaël (2018)
My Best Friend Anne Frank (2021)

External links

1947 births
Living people
Dutch film directors
Mass media people from Amsterdam
Golden Calf winners